The 1974 Lower Hutt mayoral election was part of the New Zealand local elections held that same year. The elections were held for the role of Mayor of Lower Hutt plus other local government positions including sixteen city councillors, also elected triennially. The polling was conducted using the standard first-past-the-post electoral method.

Background
The incumbent Mayor, John Kennedy-Good, stood for a third term. The Citizens' Association had mended its relationship with Kennedy-Good in 1973 and his combined ticket from the previous election had merged back in to the Citizens' Association ticket. The renewed unity helped Kennedy-Good to win a much increased majority against his only challenger, deputy mayor John Seddon, and also for the Citizens' to win a large council majority, where Labour previously held a plurality of seats.

Mayoral results

Councillor results

Notes

References

Mayoral elections in Lower Hutt
1974 elections in New Zealand
Politics of the Wellington Region